The Next 100, also known as Kuo Cheng 2020, is a residential skyscraper located in Cianjhen District, Kaohsiung, Taiwan. The construction of the building began in 2015 and it was completed in 2021.

Design
Designed by Singaporean architect Soo K. Chan, Next 100 will offer 187 apartment units as well as 12 shops, with facilities including a lobby hall, reception room, library, banquet hall, community cinema, children's playroom, outdoor children's play area, chess room, KTV, starry sky bar and an indoor swimming pool. The building will also house two Michelin-starred restaurants: Japanese restaurant Den and French restaurant Liberté, which have opened in December 2020.

See also 
 List of tallest buildings in Taiwan
 List of tallest buildings in Kaohsiung
 Kingtown King Park

References

External links
Official Website of Next 100 

2021 establishments in Taiwan
Residential skyscrapers in Taiwan
Skyscrapers in Kaohsiung
Apartment buildings in Taiwan
Residential buildings completed in 2021